Marc Valiente Hernández (born 29 March 1987) is a Spanish professional footballer who plays as a central defender for Indian Super League club FC Goa.

He was formed at Barcelona and later joined Sevilla, but was mainly a reserve at both clubs. In 2010 he signed with Valladolid, where he appeared in 157 official games over a five-year span. He went on to play top-flight football in Israel, Belgium, Serbia and India.

Valiente was a Spanish youth international, and played one unofficial match for Catalonia in 2013.

Club career
Born in Granollers, Barcelona, Catalonia, Valiente started his career at FC Barcelona aged 10, being club captain for most of its youth sides and playing alongside Cesc Fàbregas, Lionel Messi, Gerard Piqué and Víctor Vázquez. He made his debut for the first team against CF Badalona in a Copa del Rey second-leg match, coming on as a substitute for Juliano Belletti at half time of the 4–0 home win.

In July 2008, after some turbulence regarding his future, Valiente moved to Sevilla FC after being released by the Blaugrana. He spent his first professional season with the Andalusians' reserves, starting most of the year in a relegation from the Segunda División.

On 21 November 2009, injuries to the first squad, mostly Federico Fazio, granted Valiente his first La Liga opportunity, as he started in the 2–1 away win against CD Tenerife. He appeared in two more games during the campaign – replacing injured Adriano before the 30-minute mark of the 1–0 win at Sporting de Gijón, and playing the first half away to eventual champions Barcelona (0–0 at halftime, 4–0 defeat)– being released by Sevilla in June 2010 and signing for three years with Real Valladolid, recently relegated to the second division.

Valiente scored his first goal as a professional on 19 September 2010, but in a 2–1 away loss to Real Betis. He contributed 33 games, nearly 3,000 minutes of action and one goal in his second year, as the Castile and León side returned to the top flight after a two-year absence.

On 2 July 2015, Valiente moved abroad for the first time, signing a three-year deal with Israel's Maccabi Haifa F.C. for an annual wage of €350,000. Valladolid received €250,000 from his sale. He was one of a contingent of Spanish players in the relatively obscure Israeli Premier League, receiving media attention back home.

After two seasons in the Middle East, Valiente moved countries again, joining K.A.S. Eupen in July 2017. He scored his first goal for his new club on 4 November, an added-time equaliser in a 4–4 Belgian First Division A draw at Sint-Truidense VV.

Valiente moved to the Serbian SuperLiga on 26 June 2018, after agreeing to a two-year deal at FK Partizan. He joined the squad the next day, being given the number 6 jersey and in the process becoming the first Spaniard in their history.

On 25 July 2019, Valiente returned to Spain by signing a two-year contract with Sporting de Gijón of the second tier. Days after its expiration, it was renewed for another year.

In June 2022, aged 35, Valiente moved to the Indian Super League with FC Goa, managed by his compatriot Carlos Peña.

International career
Valiente was a Spanish international at under-19 and under-20 levels. On 30 December 2013 he earned his first and only cap for the Catalonia regional team, starting in the 4–1 defeat of Cape Verde held at the Estadi Olímpic Lluís Companys.

Career statistics

Club

Honours
Sevilla
Copa del Rey: 2009–10

Maccabi Haifa
Israel State Cup: 2015–16

Partizan
Serbian Cup: 2018–19

Spain U19
UEFA European Under-19 Championship: 2006

References

External links

1987 births
Living people
Spanish footballers
Footballers from Granollers
Association football defenders
La Liga players
Segunda División players
Segunda División B players
Tercera División players
FC Barcelona C players
FC Barcelona Atlètic players
FC Barcelona players
Sevilla Atlético players
Sevilla FC players
Real Valladolid players
Sporting de Gijón players
Israeli Premier League players
Maccabi Haifa F.C. players
Belgian Pro League players
K.A.S. Eupen players
Serbian SuperLiga players
FK Partizan players
Indian Super League players
FC Goa players
Spain youth international footballers
Catalonia international footballers
Spanish expatriate footballers
Expatriate footballers in Israel
Expatriate footballers in Belgium
Expatriate footballers in Serbia
Expatriate footballers in India
Spanish expatriate sportspeople in Israel
Spanish expatriate sportspeople in Belgium
Spanish expatriate sportspeople in Serbia
Spanish expatriate sportspeople in India